Neil George Cubie (3 November 1932 – March 1977) was a South African professional footballer who played as a right back.

Career
Born in Cape Town, Cubie played for Clyde, Bury, Hull City and Scarborough. He was one of three South African footballers to play for Hull City in the 1950s, the others being Alf Ackerman and Norman Nielson.

References

1932 births
1977 deaths
South African soccer players
Bury F.C. players
Hull City A.F.C. players
Scarborough F.C. players
English Football League players
Association football fullbacks
South African expatriate soccer players
South African expatriate sportspeople in England
Expatriate footballers in England
Soccer players from Cape Town